Mellis is a small village in Suffolk, England.  It has the largest area of unfenced common land in England.  Oliver Cromwell exercised his troops in Mellis. It once had a railway station on the main line between London and Norwich, and a small branch line that ran to nearby Eye.

Mellis Common is a 59 hectare nature reserve. In summer rare plants such as green-winged orchid, sulphur clover and adder's tongue fern flourish. The abundance of small mammals also makes the site a favourite hunting ground for barn owl and tawny owl.

The 14th-century parish church of St Mary, restored in 1859 and 1900, is a Grade II* listed building.

In 1968, Roger Deakin (1943 – 2006), writer and environmentalist, bought Walnut Tree Farm on the edge of Mellis Common, which he rebuilt over many years and where he lived until his death.

References

External links

Diss Express - village's local newspaper website
Mellis Village council - village's parish council
 - Mellis C.E.V.C school

Villages in Suffolk
Mid Suffolk District
Civil parishes in Suffolk